Dick Wilcock  (born 1868) was a Welsh international footballer. He was part of the Wales national football team, playing 1 match and scoring 1 goal on 8 February 1890 against Ireland during the 1889–90 British Home Championship.

See also
 List of Wales international footballers (alphabetical)

References

1868 births
Welsh footballers
Wales international footballers
Place of birth missing
Year of death missing

Association footballers not categorized by position